was a Japanese baseball outfielder from Daitō, Osaka who played professionally for the Orix Buffaloes.  He played two seasons for the club, hitting .262 in his rookie year in 2008 and .303 in 2009, his final professional season. Before joining the Buffaloes, he played at Jinsei Gakuen High School and Kinki University, where he was drafted in 2007. Oze received the memorable nickname "José" from Orix alum Ichiro Suzuki during the latter's visit to Buffaloes spring training.

Oze died on February 5, 2010, in an apparent suicide by jumping from the tenth floor of his hotel during spring training in Miyakojima, Okinawa.

References

Orix Buffaloes players
1985 births
2010 suicides
Nippon Professional Baseball outfielders
Japanese baseball players
People from Daitō, Osaka
Suicides by jumping in Japan